Nariman is a 2001 Indian Malayalam-language investigative film directed by K. Madhu and written by S. N. Swamy. It stars Suresh Gopi in the title role, with Samyuktha Varma, Siddique, Jagadish, Sadiq, Vijayakumar, Janardhanan, Jagathy Sreekumar, Spadikam George, N. F. Varghese and Rajan P. Dev in supporting roles. The plot follows Ashok Nariman, a Crime Branch DySP who is assigned to re-investigate the "couple murder case" and then to investigate the "Ammini missing case". The film was dubbed in Hindi as Farz Ki Pukaar and in Telugu as Senathipathi.

Plot
Manu, the accused in the notorious couple murder case, attempts an escape during his prison transfer but end up being shot. Although severely wounded, he survives despite being showered with bullets by the police. Dr. Giri, a senior surgeon take pity on the escaped criminal who is to be hanged for his crime. Manu is accused to having murdered his elder brother and sister-in-law out of lust for the latter, in an attempted rape. For various reasons Dr. Giri believes Manu to be innocent. He convinces his friend Shekharan, the Chief Minister of Kerala , to re-open the case and assign the case to a sincere and brilliant, yet aggressive police officer Ashok Nariman.

Initially termed "hopeless" by the legal advisors — due to the excellent way the case was framed — Nariman find loopholes . He learns that the crime was committed by the intelligent Adv. Padhmanabhan Thampi and his friends Kochunarayanan, Superintendent of Police (SP) Philippose and their allies including Musthafa Kamal (a.k.a. Karate Kamal) — who executed the crime. Nariman submit his report and the case comes to the Sessions Court. To everyone's dismay, the Judge refuses to have a second hearing of the case — as earlier the case had gone up to Supreme Court awarding capital punishment and even the President of India did not have any pity on the "perpetrator" Manu so as to pardon his sentence. The Judge believes the case to be a publicity stunt as the result of the change in Government and the Court cannot be deceived by any.

Disappointed at the happenings, Nariman takes over a new case — Ammini missing case. Ammini was an ally, a prostitute, a pimp and an outlet for the illegal liquor dealings of Kochunarayanan. Lately she had a change of mind, to retreat from her wrong way of life, to be with her daughter who hated Ammini's activities. This provoked Adv. Thampi, as she knew many of their secrets, even to an extent more than they know of each other. He even had suspicion of her being the reason for the police storming the secret hide-out of Kamal. Nariman reports the four guilty of murder and the case reaches the same Sessions Court. The four were found to be guilty by Court, even with an experienced senior lawyer (Adv. Vaikuntam appearing for them against the inexperienced public prosecutor Adv. Sethulekshmi, the love interest of Nariman.

While the Judge reads his judgement, Nariman — to everyone's surprise — interrupt the Judge to say the four are innocent. He presents Ammini, the very same Ammini that the Court declared dead. He confesses his act on how the four became 'culprits' and how the case was framed using strong, but fake evidences (as in the couple murder case) that not even an experienced lawyer could expose. If an average police officer could easily deceive the Court, he exclaims what will happen if an evil genius with a group of powerful allies sets out on a rampage. If the Court, where common people seek justice, fails to stop them then there would be a state of anarchy where people won't hesitate to act worse. Through his drama, he pleads justice for Manu.

Although initially furious with his actions, the Judge realizes that the Court can be deceived at times and allows for a second hearing in Manu's case. Through the proceedings months after, Manu is found innocent by the Court and the guilty quadruplet — Adv. Thampi, Kochunarayanan, Philipose and Kamal — get their punishment.

Cast

References

External links
 
 Nariman at the Malayalam Movie Database

2000s Malayalam-language films
Films scored by M. G. Radhakrishnan
2001 action films
2000s crime thriller films
Films directed by K. Madhu